Publius Ventidius ( 89–38 BC) was a Roman general and one of Julius Caesar's protégés. He won key victories against the Parthians which resulted in the deaths of key leaders – victories which redeemed the losses of Crassus and paved the way for Antony's incursions. According to Plutarch in his "Life of Antony", the three military victories of Ventidius over the Parthians singularly resulted in the only award (up to the time of Plutarch's writing) to a Roman general of the triumphal ceremony for victory over Parthians.

History

Ventidius was from Picenum. He and his mother were captured during the Social War, and both were marched as prisoners in Pompey Strabo's triumph through the streets of Rome. He was forced to work as a muleteer and quickly saw the Roman army as his path to advancement. Ventidius attracted Caesar's notice during the Gallic Wars, and while he does not receive mention in Caesar's commentaries, he did execute Caesar's orders with ability during Caesar's civil war, and became one of Caesar's favorites.

Ventidius chose to stand back during the early stages of Mark Antony's struggle with Octavian, eventually throwing his lot in with Antony. After the formation of the Second Triumvirate, Ventidius was appointed suffect consul. During Antony's absence in Egypt in 41 BC, Ventidius did nothing to support Antony's brother Lucius Antonius or Antony's wife Fulvia during their struggle with Octavian.

After Antony had come to an agreement with Octavian off of Cape Misenum (probably in August 39), he sent Ventidius with several legions in response to a Parthian invasion launched in 40 BC. Ventidius' first major success came when he defeated Quintus Labienus and Phranipates (the best of King Orodes' military commanders) at the Battle of the Cilician Gates and the Amanus Pass. After hearing of the battles while in Athens, Antony put on a public feast in the town, then proceeded to the Levant to join him.

Despite this setback, the Parthians launched another invasion into Syria led by Pacorus, the son of King Orodes. Ventidius met Pacorus' huge army in the Battle of Cyrrhestica where he inflicted an overwhelming defeat which resulted in the death of Pacorus. This victory was the culmination of Ventidius' campaigns, which confined the Parthians within Media (Medes) and Mesopotamia, and psychologically avenged the losses of Crassus, particularly at Carrhae. Ventidius could have pursued the Parthians even further: but, according to Plutarch, Ventidius had concerns regarding the possible jealousy of Antony; and, he preferred to subdue those who had rebelled against Roman authority to pursuing the Parthians with his forces.

One such rebel was Antiochus of Commagene, whom he besieged in Samosata. Antiochus tried to make peace with Ventidius, but Ventidius told him to approach Antony directly. Wanting some of the glory for himself, Antony would not allow a treaty and proceeded to take over the siege. Antony's siege proved to be less effective than Ventidius', and Antony made peace. Whereas the treaty Antiochus originally offered Ventidius contained an indemnity of 1,000 talents, the final treaty with Antony had an indemnity of only 300 talents. After peace was concluded, Antony sent Ventidius back to Rome where he celebrated a triumph, the first Roman to triumph over the Parthians. After celebrating his triumph, Ventidius is not mentioned again.

In Shakespeare
Ventidius appears briefly in Shakespeare's play Antony and Cleopatra, where he is shown leading the Roman forces against Parthia. He muses over whether to risk rousing his superior's jealousy by going further than he has; after which he disappears from the play.

Citations

References

External links
 Dictionary of Greek and Romans – 1867

1st-century BC Roman governors of Syria
1st-century BC Roman consuls
Ancient Roman generals
People of the Roman–Parthian Wars
Ventidii